Cölpin is a municipality in the Mecklenburgische Seenplatte district, in Mecklenburg-Vorpommern, Germany.

References 

Municipalities in Mecklenburg-Western Pomerania